John-Clay Purves MD (30 January 1825–26 July 1903) was a British geologist and museum curator.

Biography
Purves initially qualified in medicine at the University of Edinburgh before joining the army and travelling as an army doctor. He had spent a couple of years working for the Geological Survey in Scotland before joining the Yorkshire Museum in 1878. He was initially employed as a temporary assistant to the museum before being made permanent Keeper following the death of the sub-curator Henry Baines. He resigned this post in 1880 following his appointment to the Geological Survey of Belgium.

In his subsequent geological career he is attributed with naming the Namurian; a stage in the regional stratigraphy of northwest Europe with an age between roughly 326 and 313 Ma (million years ago).

Publications
PURVES, J.C., 1881. 'Sur la délimitation et la constitution de l’étage houiller inférieur de la Belgique'. Bulletin de l’Académie royale de Belgique, Classe des Sciences, 3° série, 2: 514–568.
PURVES, J.C., 1883. 'Terrain houiller'. In: Dupont, E. ; Mourlon, M. & Purves, J.C., Explication de la feuille de Natoye. Musée royal d’Histoire naturelle, Explication de la Carte géologique du Royaume: 1–50

References

1825 births
British geologists
British curators
1903 deaths
Yorkshire Museum people
Alumni of the University of Edinburgh
Members of the Yorkshire Philosophical Society
People from Coldstream